Henry Thomas "Harry" May (1 August 1892 – 13 May 1972) was an Australian politician who was a Labor Party member of the Legislative Assembly of Western Australia from 1947 to 1968, representing the seat of Collie.

Biography
May was born in Minster-on-Sea, Kent, England. He arrived in Australia in 1911, to farm wheat at Narrogin. In May 1915, May enlisted in the Australian Imperial Force, serving in the Gallipoli Campaign as a private in the 2/28th Battalion. He was discharged from service in August 1916, sick with enteric fever, and afterward worked as a clerk for the federal Repatriation Department. He eventually settled in Collie, working a variety of roles in the coal industry. A long-time member of the Labor Party, May first attempted to enter politics at the 1944 Legislative Council elections, but was defeated by the sitting Nationalist member, Les Craig. At the 1947 state election, he was elected to the Legislative Assembly seat of Collie, replacing his father-in-law, Arthur Wilson. After Labor's victory at the 1953 election, May was appointed chief whip in the government of Albert Hawke. He remained Labor whip until his retirement at the 1968 election. May died in Perth in 1972, aged 79. His son, Donald George May, was also a member of parliament, and the pair sat together in the Legislative Assembly between 1962 and 1965, the first father and son to do so.

References

1892 births
1972 deaths
Australian Army soldiers
Australian Labor Party members of the Parliament of Western Australia
Australian military personnel of World War I
British emigrants to Australia
Members of the Western Australian Legislative Assembly
People from Minster, Swale
20th-century Australian politicians